John Broderick may refer to:

 John Broderick (writer) (1924–1989), Irish novelist
 John Broderick (producer) (1942–2001), American film producer, entertainer and editor
 John Broderick (politician) (1865–1939), Irish-born Chicago politician, member of the Illinois state senate
 John R. Broderick (born 1955), American academic administrator
 John T. Broderick, Jr. (born 1947), former Chief Justice of the New Hampshire Supreme Court
 John Broderick (British diplomat), former British ambassador to Cuba, 1931–1933
 John Broderick (lacrosse) (1877–1957), Canadian Olympic lacrosse player
 Johnny Broderick (1894–1966), New York City police detective